Rosetta Cattaneo (14 January 1919 – 1988) was an Italian sprinter. She was the italian record holder for women in the 200 metres with the time of 25.3 established in 1940.

Biography
She won a bronze medal in the 4×100 metres relay, the first medal ever for Italian women in a relay race, at the 1938 European Athletics Championships in Vienna, with co-runners Maria Apollonio, Maria Alfero and Italia Lucchini She has 8 caps in national team from 1937 to 1942.

Achievements

National titles
Rosetta Cattaneo has won the individual national championship four times.
4 wins in the 200 metres (1939, 1940, 1942, 1943)

See also
 Italy national relay team

References

External links
 
 Dizionario biografico delle donne lombarde: 568-1968 - Rosetta Cattaneo 

1919 births
1988 deaths
Athletes from Milan
Italian female sprinters
European Athletics Championships medalists